William Waddell House is a historic home located near Grassy Creek, Ashe County, North Carolina.  It was built between 1820 and 1830, and is a two-story, three bay, "L" plan brick dwelling with a one-story ell. The interior was restored after a fire about 1868–1871. Also on the property is a contributing log granary (c. 1875) and family cemetery.

It was listed on the National Register of Historic Places in 1976.

References

Houses on the National Register of Historic Places in North Carolina
Houses completed in 1830
Houses in Ashe County, North Carolina
National Register of Historic Places in Ashe County, North Carolina
1830 establishments in North Carolina